Borea was one of eight s built for the  (Royal Italian Navy) during the late 1920s. She was named after a northerly wind, Borea, bringing frigid, dry air to the Italian peninsula. The ship played a minor role in the Spanish Civil War of 1936–1937, supporting the Nationalists.

Design and description
The Turbine-class destroyers were enlarged and improved versions of the preceding  s. Their complement was 12 officers and 167 enlisted men.

The Turbines were powered by two Parsons geared steam turbines, each driving one propeller shaft using steam supplied by three Thornycroft boilers.

Their main battery consisted of four  guns in two twin-gun turrets, one each fore and aft of the superstructure. Anti-aircraft (AA) defense for the Turbine-class ships was provided by a pair of  AA guns in single mounts amidships and a twin-gun mount for  machine guns. They were equipped with six  torpedo tubes in two triple mounts amidships. The Turbines could carry 52 mines.

Construction and career

Borea was laid down by Gio. Ansaldo & C. at their Genoa shipyard on 29 April 1925, launched on 28 January 1927 and completed on 14 November. The ship was initially assigned to the 5th Destroyer Squadron for a short time. In March 1928 she participated in a training cruise in the Tyrrhenian Sea. In 1928 the destroyer also visited Ibiza, followed up by another cruise to Tripoli in 1929. In the summer of 1930 Borea together with the ships of her squadron participated in the training cruise in the Aegean Sea visiting Nafplion, Thessaloniki, Rhodes and other Dodecanese islands.

During the Spanish Civil War Borea conducted 4 reconnaissance missions in autumn 1936 on behalf of the Nationalists. In August–September 1937 she participated in the Italian blockade of Republican Spain and performed three missions enforcing the blockade. In summer 1938 she conducted several patrol and escort missions from her temporary base at the Balearic Islands.

At the end of 1938 she was relocated to Tobruk, then briefly recalled in the spring of 1939 to participate in the invasion of Albania before returning to Tobruk in the autumn of the same year.

Borea was assigned escort duties, accompanying convoys from Sicily to Libya.

On 30 June 1940 a large Italian convoy sailed from Augusta carrying troops, supplies, ammunition and fuel. The convoy consisted of six cargo and passenger ships and was escorted by 6 destroyers, including Borea, and 4 torpedo boats. On 5 July 1940 there were seven s berthed in Tobruk harbor together with four torpedo boats, six freighters and several auxiliary vessels. Between 10:00 to 11:15 a Short Sunderland reconnaissance plane overflew the harbor at an altitude of 1,500-2,000 meters and despite the anti-aircraft fire opened against it, confirmed the presence of numerous ships in the harbor. In the late afternoon a group of nine Fairey Swordfish torpedo bombers of 813 Naval Air Squadron took off from the airfield in Sidi Barrani and headed towards Tobruk. The air alarm was sounded at 20:06 but the Italians failed to detect the Allied aircraft until they were already over the harbor at 20:20. Destroyers had most of their personnel on board the steamers Liguria and Sabbia with exception of dedicated air-defense crews. The attack commenced a few minutes later, and lasted only seven minutes and resulted in five Italian ships being sunk or damaged. Not encountering any aerial opposition, British torpedo bombers attacked from low altitude (around 100 feet), and released their torpedoes from 400–500 meters away, almost point-blank. Zeffiro was attacked first by a plane piloted by Nicholas Kennedy, whose torpedo hit the ship in the bow, around the ammunition magazine, between the bridge and a 120 mm cannon. The explosion broke the ship into two and sank it half an hour later. Freighter  was also hit, capsized and sank, while  and steamer  were hit, and had to be beached, and the ocean liner  was hit and damaged. Two planes also attacked other destroyers, but failed to launch their torpedoes due to intense anti-aircraft fire.

On 13 September 1940 the Italian Army invaded Egypt and captured Sollum. A convoy was sighted travelling east along the Libyan coast on 15 September by a Short Sunderland flying boat from 230 Squadron. In attempt to help their ground force, the Royal Navy designed attacks on Italian bases, in particular, Benghazi.

At 19:30 steamers Maria Eugenia and Gloria Stella escorted by  arrived from Tripoli bringing the total number of vessels present in the harbor to 32. During the night of 16-17 September nine Swordfish bombers of 815 Squadron RAF carrying bombs and torpedoes, and six from 819 Squadron RAF armed with mines took off from Illustrious and approximately at 00:30 arrived undetected over Benghazi harbor. The anti-aircraft defenses opened fire but were unable to stop the attack. After passing over the harbor to determine their targets, the Swordfish bombers made their first attack at 00:57 hitting and sinking  and severely damaging torpedo boat , harbor tug Salvatore Primo and an auxiliary vessel Giuliana. The bombers then conducted a second assault at 1:00 striking and sinking . Borea was also targeted during the second sweep, with the first bomb exploding between the destroyer and the steamer  but causing no damage to either ship. A short while later, a second bomb hit Borea on her port side, around 40/39 mm cannon platform. The bomb penetrated all the way down into the hold and exploded breaking the ship in two causing rapid flooding and sinking in shallow waters of the harbor. Due to rapid sinking most of the crew was able to easily abandon ship either by jumping or simply walking off the bridge and swimming towards the destroyer Aquilone. There was a single casualty, a sailor who at the moment of the attack was sleeping in the engine room, near the area of bomb explosion.

Notes

Bibliography

External links
 Borea (1927) Marina Militare website

Turbine-class destroyers
World War II destroyers of Italy
1927 ships
Ships built by Gio. Ansaldo & C.
Ships built in Genoa
Maritime incidents in September 1940
World War II shipwrecks in the Mediterranean Sea
Ships sunk by British aircraft
Destroyers sunk by aircraft